Konstantin Yuryevich Antipov (born 17 March 1999) is a Russian football player.

Club career
He made his debut in the Russian Professional Football League for FC Sibir-2 Novosibirsk on 7 August 2018 in a game against FC Sakhalin Yuzhno-Sakhalinsk.

He made his Russian Football National League debut for FC Sibir Novosibirsk on 3 March 2019 in a game against FC Tyumen.

References

External links
 Profile by Russian Professional Football League

1999 births
Sportspeople from Tomsk
Living people
Russian footballers
Association football forwards
FC Tom Tomsk players
FC Arsenal Tula players
FC Sibir Novosibirsk players
FC Khimik-Arsenal players